Alpine gentian is a common name for several plants in the genus Gentiana and may refer to:

 Gentiana alpina, native to the Alps of Europe
 Gentiana newberryi, native to western North America
 Gentiana nivalis, native to Europe and northeastern North America